Uriel Álvarez Rivera (born 1 May 1990) is a Mexican professional footballer, who plays as a defender for Atlético San Luis in the Ascenso MX, on loan from Club Santos Laguna.

External links

1990 births
Living people
Sportspeople from Acapulco
Footballers from Guerrero
Mexican footballers
Santos Laguna footballers
Club Puebla players
C.D. Veracruz footballers
Atlético Morelia players
Chiapas F.C. footballers
Dorados de Sinaloa footballers
Club Tijuana footballers
Atlético San Luis footballers
Liga MX players
Association football defenders
Ascenso MX players
Liga Premier de México players
Tercera División de México players